Arakan is a historical region of Burma.

Arakan may also refer to:

Arakan Division, a British colonial division
Rakhine State, a province of Myanmar
Arakan Mountains, Myanmar
Arakanese people
Arakanese Indians
Arakanese language, a former Tibeto-Burmese language, now split into two distinct languages: Rakhine and Marma
Arakan Campaign 1942–43, a campaign during World War II
Arakan, Cotabato, Philippines
Arakan River, Philippines